Tata D.A.V. Public School, established 1984, is an English medium co-educational senior secondary school, situated at Jamadoba, Dhanbad, Jharkhand, India.

Accreditation
Tata D.A.V. Public School, Jamadoba is affiliated with the Central Board of Secondary Education (CBSE), which is the largest educational board in the country.

See also
Dayanand Anglo-Vedic Schools System
Education in India
Literacy in India
List of schools in India

References

External links 

Private schools in Jharkhand
Schools affiliated with the Arya Samaj
Education in Dhanbad district
Educational institutions established in 1984
1984 establishments in Bihar